Diego Guerrero (born 26 June 1986) is a Venezuelan international footballer who plays for Aragua FC, as a defensive midfielder.

Career
Born in San Cristóbal, Guerrero has played club football for Loteria del Táchira, Deportivo Táchira, Monagas and Real Esppor.

He made his international debut for Venezuela in 2012.

References

1986 births
Living people
Venezuelan footballers
Venezuela international footballers
Deportivo Táchira F.C. players
Monagas S.C. players
Real Esppor Club players
Deportivo La Guaira players
Association football midfielders
People from San Cristóbal, Táchira